John Cuff (1805 – 6 December 1864) was a New Zealand politician. He represented the Akaroa electorate in the 2nd New Zealand Parliament from 1855 to 1858, but resigned before the end of his term. He did not serve in any subsequent Parliaments.

He died in Christchurch on 6 December 1864 aged 59 years.

References

1805 births
1864 deaths
Members of the New Zealand House of Representatives
New Zealand MPs for South Island electorates
19th-century New Zealand politicians